is a highly eccentric, stony asteroid, classified as a near-Earth object of the Amor group of asteroids, approximately 3 kilometers in diameter. It was discovered on 22 June 1993, by American astronomers Eleanor Helin and Kenneth Lawrence at the U.S. Palomar Observatory in California.

Classification and orbit 

The stony S-type asteroid orbits the Sun at a distance of 1.1–3.7 AU once every 3 years and 10 months (1,392 days). Its orbit has an eccentricity of 0.54 and an inclination of 8° with respect to the ecliptic. As it crosses the orbit of Mars, it may also be classified as a Mars-crosser, and, on 28 November 2023, it will pass  from the Red Planet. The first precovery was taken at the Australian Siding Spring Observatory in 1981, extending the body's observation arc by 12 years prior to its discovery.

Physical characteristics 

Since the 1990s, and up to June 2016, four well-defined rotational lightcurves were obtained for this asteroid from photometric observations, giving a rotation period of approximately 4.95 hours with a high brightness variation between 0.53 and 0.82 in magnitude, indicating that the asteroid has a non-spheroidal shape. In the 1990s, Italian astronomer Stefano Mottola obtained a lightcurve at La Silla during the EUNEASO, a European near-Earth object search and follow-up observation program to determine additional physical parameters.

Further lightcurves were obtained by Polish astronomer Wiesław Z. Wiśniewski at UA's LPL in October 1993, and by Czech astronomer Petr Pravec at Ondřejov Observatory in September 1997. In June 2016, the fourth and most recent photometric observation was made by American astronomer Brian Warner at his Palmer Divide Station, Colorado, which gave a period of  hours with an amplitude of 0.82 in magnitude.

Diameter 

While in the 1990s, Stefano Mottola estimated the asteroid to measure 3.8 kilometers in diameter (H = 15.03), the Collaborative Asteroid Lightcurve Link assumes a standard albedo for stony asteroids of 0.20 and derives a shorter diameter of 2.8 kilometers, based on an absolute magnitude of 15.14.

Notes

References

External links 
 Asteroid Lightcurve Database (LCDB), query form (info )
 Dictionary of Minor Planet Names, Google books
 Asteroids and comets rotation curves, CdR – Observatoire de Genève, Raoul Behrend
 
 
 

005836
Discoveries by Eleanor F. Helin
Discoveries by Kenneth J. Lawrence
005836
19930622